Oryctocephalus indicus is a species of corynexochid trilobite from the Cambrian. Its first appearance is proposed for the lower boundary of the Wuliuan, which corresponds to the beginning of the Miaolingian (The other proposal was Ovatoryctocara granulata). The species was first described by the British paleontologist Frederick Richard Cowper Reed in 1910 as Zacanthoides indicus. It was transferred to the genus Oryctocephalus by the American paleontologist Charles Elmer Resser in 1938.

References

Oryctocephalidae
Cambrian trilobites
Fossil taxa described in 1910
Index fossils